Carla Hall (born May 12, 1964) is an American chef, television personality and former model.

She appeared in the fifth and eighth seasons of Top Chef, Bravo's cooking competition show. She was a cohost on The Chew, a one-hour talk show centered on food from all angles, which premiered on ABC in September 2011.

Early life and education
Hall was born and raised in Nashville, Tennessee. Hall graduated from Hillsboro High School.

She graduated from Howard University's Business School with a degree in accounting in 1986. She then worked at Price Waterhouse in Tampa, Florida, and became a Certified Public Accountant. Hall hated her job and left after two years.

Modeling career
Hall then spent several years working as a model on the runways of Paris, Milan and London. During this time, she decided to pursue a culinary career.

Early chef career
Upon returning to the United States, Hall moved to Washington, D.C. When Hall brought some leftover sandwiches to her friend's office, and the friend's coworkers all wanted her to come again, she decided to start a lunch delivery service called the Lunch Bunch. After four years, she enrolled in L'Academie de Cuisine in Bethesda, Maryland, graduating with a Culinary Career Training certificate. From here, she went on to serve an externship at the Henley Park Hotel, where she was then promoted to sous chef. By 1999, Hall was the executive chef at the Garden Cafe in the State Plaza Hotel, a sister hotel. She then served as executive chef of the Washington Club, a private social club.

Catering business
In 2001, Hall started her own catering company, Alchemy Caterers, based in Wheaton, Maryland. Hall remains in charge of the company, which she renamed Alchemy by Carla Hall. Hall has written the cookbook Cooking with Love: Comfort Food that Hugs You.

Top Chef
Hall's big break came in 2008, when she was selected to be a contestant on the fifth season of Top Chef. In the beginning, she was in the middle in most episodes, but was in the top for the Thanksgiving challenge.  After Episode 10, she wowed the judges with her crawfish gumbo, going on to win Super Bowl XLIII tickets for this victory.  After this, she won two more challenges and was in the top for several others. Most notably, she impressed Jacques Pépin, who said he could "die happy" after eating her fresh peas, and Emeril Lagasse, who said he loved her gumbo. However, in the final challenge in New Orleans, she and Stefan Richter ended as runners-up to champion Hosea Rosenberg.

On the show, Hall gained popularity for her personality, although she did not win Fan Favorite in her season.  She became known for her call-and-response catch phrase "Hootie Hoo!", a tradition she and her husband had whenever trying to locate one another in public.  Hall also became known on Top Chef for her philosophy of "cooking with love", which she defined as putting one's own care and warmth into food. She believes that if one is happy and calm while cooking, then this will show in the food, making it much better, whereas if one feels otherwise, it will degrade their cuisine. For this reason, she says that, “If you’re not in a good mood, the only thing you should make is a reservation."

Hall was part of the cast of Top Chef: All-Stars, the eighth season of the show, which consisted of participants from past seasons. She performed well in this season, which included demonstrating her chicken pot pie recipe on Late Night with Jimmy Fallon. Hall finished fifth overall in the competition, but was awarded "Fan Favorite" for the season by viewers of the show, which included beating out Fabio Viviani, who was voted Fan Favorite over Hall when they both appeared in Season 5.

The Chew
Since the first show that aired on September 26, 2011, Hall has been one of 5 cohosts on The Chew, a one-hour show on ABC centered on food from all angles. The show replaced All My Children. Hall remained a cohost of the show until its cancellation in spring 2018.

Restaurant
In 2014, Hall launched a Kickstarter campaign where she raised $264,703 that exceeded her $250,000 goal from 1550 backers for the opening of her restaurant. The restaurant, Carla Hall's Southern Kitchen, opened June 17, 2016, in Brooklyn, New York. The restaurant closed in August 2017.

Media appearances
Hall appeared on the May 3, 2009, cover of the Washington Post Magazine, on a feature called "Fit for Fame", about still exercising while being famous.

She portrayed a version of herself named "Spaghetti Scientist Carla Hall" in the BoJack Horseman episode "That Went Well". She voiced Mpishi the harrier hawk in a season 2 episode of Disney Junior's The Lion Guard titled "Ono and the Egg". She also voiced the president in Season 1, Episode 5, titled "A Grilled Cheese for the Big Cheese!" from Nickelodeon's animated series Butterbean's Café.

On April 17, 2018, General Hospital tweeted Hall would appear on the ABC soap opera, and Soap Opera Digest states it will be May 2018.

Hall has appeared as a judge on Food Network's Halloween Baking Championship.

In 2020, Hall appeared as a judge in the Channel 4 competition series Crazy Delicious. The show took place on an edible set and was hosted by British comedian Jayde Adams alongside chefs and fellow judges Heston Blumenthal and Niklas Ekstedt.

As of 2020, Hall is currently with Sesame Street characters Cookie Monster and Gonger in a series of segments called Snack Chat.

In 2021, she appeared in Antiques Roadshow Celebrity Edition, episode 2.

In 2021, she is hosting Worst Cooks in America with Anne Burrell, and is a host and judge on Best Baker in America.

Personal life
Hall lives in Washington, D.C. She married Matthew Lyons in 2006.  She has a stepson Noah.

References

External links

Carla Hall's Southern Kitchen
Biography on Bravo TV Top Chef Website
Interview with the Washington Post
Interview with WineFoot.com

Living people
People from Nashville, Tennessee
People from Washington, D.C.
Top Chef contestants
Howard University alumni
African-American female models
American chefs
1964 births
21st-century African-American people
21st-century African-American women
20th-century African-American people
20th-century African-American women